Violet Yong Wui Wui is a Malaysian lawyer and politician from the Democratic Action Party (DAP), a component party of the Pakatan Harapan (PH) opposition coalition. She has served as Member of the Sarawak State Legislative Assembly (MLA) for Pending since May 2006. She is also one of the only two Sarawak PH and DAP MLAs along with Chong Chieng Jen.

Education
Yong is a holder of Bachelor of Laws from University of Melbourne, Australia.

Legal career
Yong is a practicing lawyer at Messrs Chong Brothers Advocates, Kuching.

Political career
Yong's initiation to politics began as a child. As a first-hand witness to politics, she tagged along with her parents, active DAP members, to party activities and while they helped with canvassing during state elections.

Yong joined the Democratic Action Party at the age of 29 after graduating from Melbourne. In early 2005, some party leaders in the state lobbied for her to be a candidate.

Her big win came in the 2006 Sarawak state election when she won the seat of Pending (state constituency), which was considered to be an SUPP-BN stronghold since 1991. From then on, she has continued to gain substantial majority in the ensuing state elections for her constituency.

Within her political party, she also heads the Women's Affairs department.

Yong is sometimes associated with the moniker "Cili Padi" or Bird's eye chilli in English due to her pluckiness at voicing out problems and issues affecting the people.

Sarawak State Election, 2006
Yong pulled off one of the biggest upsets in the 2006 Sarawak state election when she defeated SUPP secretary general Datuk Sim Kheng Hui with a majority of 4,372 votes. Before he was defeated in 2006, Datuk Sim had been assemblyman of Pending (state constituency) since 1991.

Sarawak State Election, 2011
In the 2011 Sarawak state election, Yong received 14,375 votes and won with a majority of 7,595 votes. She defeated Dr. Sim Kui Hian from SUPP under Barisan Nasional who received 6,780 votes.

Sarawak State Election, 2016
In the 2016 Sarawak state election, Violet Yong won the seat of N10 Pending (state constituency) for a third term against incoming SUPP candidate Milton Foo Tiang Wee.

Sarawak State Election, 2021
In the 2021 Sarawak state election, Violet Yong again won the seat of Pending for the fourth consecutive term against Gabungan Parti Sarawak (GPS) candidate. However, her party and coalition, DAP and PH suffered its worst defeat and performed most poorly in the electoral history, winning only two state seats, another being Padungan by Chong Chieng Jen of DAP. The two other PH component parties, People's Justice Party (PKR) and National Trust Party (AMANAH) were defeated in all seats they had contested.

Election results

See also
 Pending (state constituency)

References

Living people
1977 births
21st-century Malaysian politicians
Sarawak politicians
21st-century Malaysian lawyers
Democratic Action Party (Malaysia) politicians
Members of the Sarawak State Legislative Assembly
Women MLAs in Sarawak
University of Melbourne alumni
Malaysian politicians of Chinese descent
Malaysian women lawyers
21st-century Malaysian women politicians